The Orion Society is a United States non-profit organization that engages environmental and cultural issues through publication of books, magazines, and educational materials, and facilitation of informational networks.  It was founded in 1992 and is based in Great Barrington, Massachusetts.  The Society is probably best known as publisher of Orion magazine.

See also 

 Conservation ethic
 Conservation movement
 Ecology movement
 Environmentalism
 List of environmental organizations
 Sustainability

References

External links
Orion Magazine

Environmental education
Environmental organizations based in Massachusetts
Non-profit organizations based in Massachusetts